Four Dwellings Academy (formerly Four Dwellings High School) is a co-educational school with academy status, located in the Quinton area of Birmingham, England. It opened in 2020 on Quinton Road West. The old Upper School building opened in 1954 on Dwellings Lane, originally as the Four Dwellings Girls School, with the boys school being situated in the older buildings. The school went co-educational in 1970. The school held specialist Science College status before converting to academy status in March 2013.

The academy is now situated solely on the old girls school building and has approximately 450 members.

Notable former pupils 
 David Allen Green, lawyer and writer; legal correspondent for the Financial Times
 Joleon Lescott, Aaron Lescott, Daniel Sturridge, Temitope Obadeyi, Stephen Turnbull, Amari'i Bell - Professional footballers

References

External links
Official school website
QCA website

Educational institutions established in 1940
Secondary schools in Birmingham, West Midlands
Academies in Birmingham, West Midlands
1940 establishments in England
Academies Enterprise Trust